William F. Pounds was Dean (from 1966–1980) and is a professor emeritus at the MIT Sloan School of Management. He was chief financial adviser to the Rockefeller family and an executive in many of their holdings.

He is an undergraduate alumnus Carnegie Mellon University in Chemical Engineering and a masters and PhD graduate of Carnegie Mellon's Tepper School of Business studying under Herbert Simon.

References

Year of birth missing (living people)
Carnegie Mellon University College of Engineering alumni
Living people
MIT Sloan School of Management faculty
Tepper School of Business alumni